is a platform game developed and published by Nintendo for the Nintendo Entertainment System (NES). The successor to the 1983 arcade game Mario Bros. and the first game in the Super Mario series, it was first released in 1985 for the Famicom in Japan. Following a limited US release for the NES, it was ported to international arcades for the Nintendo VS. System in early 1986. The NES version received a wide release in North America that year and in PAL regions in 1987.

Players control Mario, or his brother Luigi in the multiplayer mode, as they traverse the Mushroom Kingdom to rescue Princess Toadstool from King Koopa (later named Bowser). They traverse side-scrolling stages while avoiding hazards such as enemies and pits with the aid of power-ups such as the Super Mushroom, Fire Flower, and Starman.

The game was designed by Shigeru Miyamoto and Takashi Tezuka as "a grand culmination" of the Famicom team's three years of game mechanics and programming, drawing from their experiences working on Devil World and the side-scrollers Excitebike and Kung Fu to advance their previous work on platforming "athletic games" such as Donkey Kong and Mario Bros. The design of the first level, World 1-1, serves as a tutorial for platform gameplay.

Super Mario Bros. is frequently cited as one of the greatest video games of all time, with praise for its precise controls. It is one of the best-selling games of all time, with more than  copies sold worldwide. It is credited alongside the NES as one of the key factors in reviving the video game industry after the 1983 crash, and helped popularize the side-scrolling platform game genre. Koji Kondo's soundtrack is one of the earliest and most popular in video games, making music a centerpiece of game design. The game began a multimedia franchise including a long-running game series, an animated television series, an animated feature film, a live-action feature film and another upcoming animated feature film. It has been re-released on most Nintendo systems. Mario and Super Mario Bros. have become prominent in popular culture.

Gameplay 

In Super Mario Bros., the player controls Mario, the protagonist of the series. Mario's brother, Luigi, is controlled by the second player in the game's multiplayer mode and assumes the same plot role and functionality as Mario. The objective is to race through the Mushroom Kingdom, survive the main antagonist Bowser's forces, and save Princess Toadstool. It is a side-scrolling platform game where the player moves to the right to reach the flagpole at the end of each level.

The game world includes coins for Mario to collect and special bricks marked with a question mark (?), which when hit from below by Mario may reveal more coins or a special item. Other "secret", often invisible, bricks may contain more coins or rare items. If the player gains a Super Mushroom, Mario grows to double his size and gains the ability to break bricks above him. If Mario gets hit in this mode, then instead of dying he turns back to regular Mario. Players start with a certain number of lives and may gain additional lives by picking up green spotted orange 1-up mushrooms hidden in bricks, or by collecting 100 coins, defeating several enemies in a row with a Koopa shell, or bouncing on enemies successively without touching the ground. Mario loses a life if he takes damage while small, falls in a bottomless pit, or runs out of time. The game ends when the player runs out of lives, although a button input can be used on the game over screen to continue from the first level of the world in which the player died.

Mario's primary attack is jumping on top of enemies, though many enemies have differing responses to this. For example, a Goomba will flatten and be defeated, while a Koopa Troopa will temporarily retract into its shell, allowing Mario to use it as a projectile. These shells may be deflected off a wall to destroy other enemies, though they can also bounce back against Mario, which will hurt or kill him. Other enemies, such as underwater foes and enemies with spiked tops, cannot be jumped on and damage the player instead.  Mario can also defeat enemies above him by jumping to hit the brick that the enemy is standing on. Mario may also acquire the Fire Flower from certain "?" blocks that when picked up changes the color of Super Mario's outfit and allows him to throw fireballs. A less common item is the Starman, which often appears when Mario hits certain concealed or otherwise invisible blocks. This item makes Mario temporarily invincible to most hazards and capable of defeating enemies on contact.

The game consists of eight worlds with four sub-levels called "stages" in each world. The final stage of each world takes place in a castle where Bowser is fought above a suspension bridge; the first seven of these Bowsers are "false Bowsers" who are actually minions disguised as him, whilst the real Bowser is found in the 8th world. Bowser and his decoys are defeated by jumping over them and reaching the axe on the end of the bridge, although they can also be defeated using a Fire Flower. The game also includes some stages taking place underwater, which contain different enemies. In addition, there are bonuses and secret areas in the game. Most secret areas contain more coins for Mario to collect, but some contain "warp pipes" that allow Mario to advance directly to later worlds in the game without completing the intervening stages. After completing the game once, the player is rewarded with the ability to replay the game with changes made to increase its difficulty, such as all Goombas in the game being replaced with Buzzy Beetles, enemies similar to Koopa Troopas who cannot be defeated using the Fire Flower.

Synopsis
In the fantasy setting of the Mushroom Kingdom, a tribe of turtle-like creatures known as the Koopa Troopas invade the kingdom and uses the magic of its king, Bowser, to turn its inhabitants, known as the Mushroom People, into inanimate objects such as bricks, stones and horsehair plants. Bowser and his army also kidnap Princess Toadstool, the princess of the Mushroom Kingdom and the only one with the ability to reverse Bowser's spell. After hearing the news, Mario sets out to save the princess and free the kingdom from Bowser. After traveling through various parts of the kingdom and fighting Bowser's forces along the way, Mario reaches Bowser's final stronghold, where he is able to defeat him by striking an axe on the bridge suspended over lava he is standing on, breaking the bridge, defeating Bowser, freeing the princess and saving the Mushroom Kingdom.

Development 

Super Mario Bros. was designed by Shigeru Miyamoto and Takashi Tezuka of the Nintendo Creative Department, and largely programmed by Toshihiko Nakago of SRD Company, Ltd. The original Mario Bros., released in 1983, is an arcade platformer that takes place on a single screen with a black background. Miyamoto used the term "athletic games" to refer to what would later be known as platform games. For Super Mario Bros., Miyamoto wanted to create a more colorful "athletic game" with a scrolling screen and larger characters.

Development was a culmination of their technical knowledge from working on the 1984 titles Devil World, Excitebike and Kung Fu along with their desire to further advance the platforming "athletic game" genre they had created with their earlier games. The side-scrolling gameplay of racing game Excitebike and beat 'em up game Kung-Fu Master, the latter ported by Miyamoto's team to the NES as Kung Fu, were key steps towards Miyamoto's vision of an expansive side-scrolling platformer; in turn, Kung-Fu Master was an adaptation of the Jackie Chan film Wheels on Meals (1984). While working on Excitebike and Kung Fu, he came up with the concept of a platformer that would have the player "strategize while scrolling sideways" over long distances, have aboveground and underground levels, and have colorful backgrounds rather than black backgrounds. Super Mario Bros. used the fast scrolling game engine Miyamoto's team had originally developed for Excitebike, which allowed Mario to smoothly accelerate from a walk to a run, rather than move at a constant speed like in earlier platformers.

Miyamoto also wanted to create a game that would be the "final exclamation point" for the ROM cartridge format before the forthcoming Famicom Disk System was released. Super Mario Bros. was made in tandem with The Legend of Zelda, another Famicom game directed and designed by Miyamoto and released in Japan five months later, and the games shared some elements; for instance, the fire bars that appear in the Mario castle levels began as objects in Zelda.

To have a new game available for the end-of-year shopping season, Nintendo aimed for simplicity. The team started with a prototype in which the player moved a 16x32-pixel square around a single screen. Tezuka suggested using Mario after seeing the sales figures of Mario Bros. The team chose the name Super Mario Bros. after implementing the Super Mushroom power-up. The game initially used a concept in which Mario or Luigi could fly a rocket ship while firing at enemies, but this went unused; the final game's sky-based bonus stages are a remnant of this concept. The team found it illogical that Mario was hurt by stomping on turtles in Mario Bros. so decided that future Mario games would "definitely have it so that you could jump on turtles all you want". Miyamoto initially imagined Bowser as an ox, inspired by the Ox King from the Toei Animation film Alakazam the Great (1960). However, Tezuka decided he looked more like a turtle, and they collaborated to create his final design.

The development of Super Mario Bros. is an early example of specialization in the video game industry, made possible and necessary by the Famicom's arcade-capable hardware. Miyamoto designed the game world and led a team of seven programmers and artists who turned his ideas into code, sprites, music, and sound effects. Developers of previous hit games joined the team, importing many special programming techniques, features, and design refinements such as these: "Donkey Kongs slopes, lifts, conveyor belts, and ladders; Donkey Kong Jr.s ropes, logs and springs; and Mario Bros.s enemy attacks, enemy movement, frozen platforms and POW Blocks".

The team based the level design around a small Mario, intending to later make his size bigger in the final version, but they decided it would be fun to let Mario change his size via a power-up. The early level design was focused on teaching players that mushrooms were distinct from Goombas and would be beneficial to them, so in the first level of the game, the first mushroom is difficult to avoid if it is released. The use of mushrooms to change size was influenced by Japanese folktales in which people wander into forests and eat magical mushrooms; this also resulted in the game world being named the "Mushroom Kingdom". The team had Mario begin levels as small Mario to make obtaining a mushroom more gratifying. Miyamoto explained: "When we made the prototype of the big Mario, we did not feel he was big enough. So, we came up with the idea of showing the smaller Mario first, who could be made bigger later in the game; then players could see and feel that he was bigger." Miyamoto denied rumors that developers implemented a small Mario after a bug caused only his upper half to appear. Miyamoto said the shell-kicking 1-up trick was carefully tested, but "people turned out to be a lot better at pulling the trick off for ages on end than we thought". Other features, such as blocks containing multiple coins, were inspired by programming glitches.

Super Mario Bros. was developed for a cartridge with 256 kilobits of program code and data and 64 kilobits of sprite and background graphics. Due to this storage limitation, the designers happily considered their aggressive search for space-saving opportunities to be akin to their own fun television game show competition. For instance, clouds and bushes in the game's backgrounds use that same sprite recolored, and background tiles are generated via an automatic algorithm. Sound effects were also recycled; the sound when Mario is damaged is the same as when he enters a pipe, and Mario jumping on an enemy is the same sound as each stroke when swimming. After completing the game, the development team decided that they should introduce players with a simple, easy-to-defeat enemy rather than beginning the game with Koopa Troopas. By this point, the project had nearly run out of memory, so the designers created the Goombas by making a single static image and flipping it back and forth to save space while creating a convincing character animation. After the addition of the game's music, around 20 bytes of open cartridge space remained. Miyamoto used this remaining space to add a sprite of a crown into the game, which would appear in the player's life counter as a reward for obtaining at least 10 lives.

World 1-1 

During the third generation of video game consoles, tutorials on gameplay were rare.  Instead, players learned how a video game worked through being guided by level design. The opening section of Super Mario Bros. was therefore specifically designed in such a way that players would be forced to explore the mechanics of the game in order to be able to advance. Rather than confront the newly oriented player with obstacles, the first level of Super Mario Bros. lays down the variety of in-game hazards by means of repetition, iteration, and escalation. In an interview with Eurogamer, Miyamoto explained that he created "World 1-1" to contain everything a player needs to "gradually and naturally understand what they're doing",  so that they can quickly understand how the game works. According to Miyamoto, once the player understands the mechanics of the game, the player will be able to play more freely and it becomes "their game".

Music 

Nintendo sound designer Koji Kondo wrote the six-track score for Super Mario Bros., as well as all of the game's sound effects. At the time he was composing, video game music was mostly meant to attract attention, not necessarily to enhance or conform to the game. Kondo's work on Super Mario Bros. was one of the major forces in the shift towards music becoming an integral and participatory part of video games. Kondo had two specific goals for his music: "to convey an unambiguous sonic image of the game world", and "to enhance the emotional and physical experience of the gamer".

The music of Super Mario Bros. is coordinated with the onscreen animations of the various sprites, which was one way which Kondo created a sense of greater immersion. Kondo was not the first to do this in a video game; for instance, Space Invaders features a simple song that gets faster and faster as the aliens speed up, eliciting a sense of stress and impending doom which matches the increasing challenge of the game. Unlike most games at the time, for which composers were hired later in the process to add music to a nearly finished game, Kondo was a part of the development team almost from the beginning of production, working in tandem with the rest of the team to create the game's soundtrack. Kondo's compositions were largely influenced by the game's gameplay, intending for it to "heighten the feeling" of how the game controls.

Before composition began, a prototype of the game was presented to Kondo so that he could get an idea of Mario's general environment and revolve the music around it. Kondo wrote the score with the help of a small piano to create appropriate melodies to fit the game's environments. After the development of the game showed progress, Kondo began to feel that his music did not quite fit the pace of the game, so he changed it a bit by increasing the songs' tempos. The music was further adjusted based on the expectations of Nintendo's playtesters.

Kondo would later compose new music for the new Super Mario Bros. ice, desert, and nighttime level themes that appeared in the 2019 level-creator game Super Mario Maker 2.

Release

Super Mario Bros. was first released in Japan on Friday the 13th of September 1985, for the Family Computer (Famicom). It was released later that year in North America for the Nintendo Entertainment System (NES). Its exact North American release date is debated; though most sources report it was released in October 1985 as a launch game, when the NES had a limited release in the US, several sources suggest it was released between November 1985 and early 1986.

The arcade port for the Nintendo Vs. System debuted in London in January 1986, and was released in other countries in February 1986. It was the first version of Super Mario Bros. to receive a wide international release, and many outside of Japan were introduced to the game through the arcade version. The NES version received a wide North American release later that year, followed by Europe on May 15, 1987.

In 1988, Super Mario Bros. was re-released along with the shooting range game Duck Hunt as part of a single ROM cartridge, which came packaged with the NES as a pack-in game, as part of the console's Action Set. This version of the game is extremely common in North America, with millions of copies of it having been manufactured and sold in the United States. In 1990, another cartridge, touting the two games as well as World Class Track Meet, was also released in North America as part of the NES Power Set. It was released on May 15, 1987, in Europe, and during that year in Australia as well. In 1988, the game was re-released in Europe in a cartridge containing the game plus Tetris and Nintendo World Cup. The compilation was sold alone or bundled with the revised version of the NES.

Ports and re-releases
Super Mario Bros. has been ported and re-released several times. February 21, 1986, was the release of a conversion to Famicom Disk System, Nintendo's proprietary floppy disk drive.

Vs. Super Mario Bros. 

Vs. Super Mario Bros. is a 1986 arcade adaptation of Super Mario Bros (1985), released on the Nintendo VS. System and the Nintendo Vs. Unisystem (and its variant, Nintendo Vs. Dualsystem). Existing levels were made much more difficult, with narrower platforms, more dangerous enemies, fewer hidden power-ups, and 200 coins needed for an extra life instead of 100. Several of the new levels went on to be featured in the Japanese sequel, Super Mario Bros. 2.

The arcade game was not officially released in Japan. Illegal coin-op versions made from a Famicom console placed inside an arcade cabinet became available in Japanese arcades by January 1986. Nintendo threatened legal action or prosecution (such as a fine or threatening a maximum sentence of up to three years in prison) against Japanese arcade operators with coin-op versions of the game. Japanese arcade operators were still able to access illegal coin-op versions through 1987.

Outside of Japan, Vs. Super Mario Bros. was officially released for arcades in overseas markets during early 1986, becoming the first version of the game to get a wide international release. The arcade game debuted at the 1986 Amusement Trades Exhibition International (ATEI) show in London, held in January 1986; this was the first appearance of Super Mario Bros. in Europe. The arcade game then received a wide international release for overseas markets outside of Japan in February 1986, initially in the form of a ROM software conversion kit. In North America, the game was featured in an official contest during the ACME convention in Chicago, held in March 1986, becoming a popular attraction at the show. It soon drew a loyal following across North American arcades, and appeared as the eighth top-grossing arcade video game on the US Play Meter arcade charts in May 1986. It went on to sell 20,000 arcade units within a few months, becoming the best-selling Nintendo Vs. System release, with each unit consistently earning an average of more than $200 per week. It became the thirteenth highest-grossing arcade game of 1986 in the United States according to the annual RePlay arcade chart, which was topped by Sega's Hang-On. In Europe, it became a very popular arcade game in 1986. The arcade version introduced Super Mario Bros. to many players who did not own a Nintendo Entertainment System.

The game was re-released in emulation for the Nintendo Switch via the Arcade Archives collection on December 22, 2017. Playing that release, Chris Kohler of Kotaku called the game's intense difficulty "The meanest trick Nintendo ever played".

Super Mario Bros. Special

A remake of the game titled Super Mario Bros. Special developed by Hudson Soft was released in Japan in 1986 for the NEC PC-8801 and Sharp X1 personal computers. Though featuring similar controls and graphics, the game lacks screen scrolling due to hardware limitations, has different level designs and new items, and new enemies based on Mario Bros. and Donkey Kong.

Game & Watch
A handheld LCD game under the same name was released as a part of Nintendo's Game & Watch line of LCD games.

Modified versions
Several modified variants of the game have been released, many of which are ROM hacks of the original NES game.

On November 11, 2010, a special red variant of the Wii containing a pre-downloaded version of the game was released in Japan and Australia to celebrate its 25th anniversary. Several graphical changes include "?" blocks with the number "25" on them.

 a promotional, graphically modified version of Super Mario Bros., was officially released in Japan in December 1986 for the Famicom Disk System as a promotional item given away by the popular Japanese radio show All Night Nippon. The game was published by Fuji TV, which later published Yume Kōjō: Doki Doki Panic. The game features graphics based upon the show, with sprites of the enemies, mushroom retainers, and other characters being changed to look like famous Japanese music idols, recording artists, and DJs as well as other people related to All-Night Nippon. The game makes use of the same slightly upgraded graphics and alternate physics featured in the Japanese release of Super Mario Bros. 2. The modern collector market considers it extremely rare, selling for nearly $500, .

 is a redux of the original Super Mario Bros. with the exception of the title changed and the game was sped up to 2×. It was released on Ultimate NES Remix on the Nintendo 3DS.

Super Luigi Bros. is a redux of the game, featured within NES Remix 2, based on a mission in NES Remix. It stars only Luigi in a mirrored version of World 1–2, scrolling from left to right, with a higher jump and a slide similar to the Japanese Super Mario Bros. 2.

Super Mario Bros. 35 was a 35-player battle royale version of the game released in 2020 that was available to play for a limited time for Nintendo Switch Online subscribers.

Remakes

Super Mario All-Stars

Super Mario All-Stars, a compilation game released in 1993 for the Super Nintendo Entertainment System, features a remade version of Super Mario Bros. alongside remakes of several of the other Super Mario games released for the NES. Its version of Super Mario Bros. has improved graphics and sound to match the SNES's 16-bit capabilities, and minor alterations to some of the game's collision mechanics. The player can save progress, and multiplayer mode swaps players after every level in addition to whenever a player dies. Super Mario All-Stars was also re-released for the Wii as a repackaged 25th anniversary version, featuring the same version of the game, along with a 32-page art book and a compilation CD of music from various Super Mario games.

Super Mario Bros. Deluxe

 sometimes referred to as Super Mario Bros. DX, was released on the Game Boy Color on May 10, 1999 in North America and Europe, and in 2000 in Japan exclusively to the Nintendo Power retail service. Based on the original Super Mario Bros., it features an overworld level map, simultaneous multiplayer, a Challenge mode in which the player finds hidden objects and achieves a certain score in addition to normally completing the level, and eight additional worlds based on the main worlds of the Japanese 1986 game Super Mario Bros. 2. It is compatible with the Game Boy Printer. Compared to Super Mario Bros., the game features a few minor visual upgrades such as water and lava now being animated rather than static, and a smaller screen due to the lower resolution of the Game Boy Color.

It was released on the Nintendo 3DS Virtual Console in 2014. In Japan, users who registered a Nintendo Network ID on their Nintendo 3DS system between December 10, 2013, and January 10, 2014, received a free download code, with emails with download codes being sent out starting January 27, 2014. In Europe and Australia, users who registered a Nintendo Network ID on a Nintendo 3DS system between December 10, 2013, and January 31, 2014, received a free download code, with emails with download codes being sent out from February 13 to 28, 2014. It was released for purchase on the Nintendo 3DS eShop in Europe on February 27, 2014, in Australia on February 28, 2014, and in North America on December 25, 2014.

GamesRadar+ placed the game at number 15 in its list of the greatest Game Boy games of all time, explaining that Nintendo could have simply ported the game but instead they expanded on it. The staff opined that the only downside was the camera in the game. Jeremy Parish of USGamer praised the game, comparing it more favorably to  Super Mario All-Stars, which he said basically just improved the graphics from 8-bit to 16-bit. Instead he praised Super Mario Bros. DX for adding "considerably more" to the original games like the secret unlockable bonus, the addition of The Lost Levels, new objectives, modes, and multiplayer mechanics, along with the ability to play with Luigi's reduced friction and higher jumping physics. He described it as "a comprehensive overhaul"  of the whole Super Mario Bros. video game. Additionally, Kevin Webb of Game Informer named the game as one of greatest Game Boy games of all time. The Esquire staff ranked it as the 9th greatest Game Boy game.

Emulation
As one of Nintendo's most popular games, Super Mario Bros. has been re-released and remade numerous times, with every single major Nintendo console up to the Nintendo Switch sporting its own port or remake of the game with the exception of the Nintendo 64.

In early 2003, Super Mario Bros. was ported to the Game Boy Advance as a part of the Famicom Minis collection in Japan and as a part of the NES Series in the US. This version of the game is emulated, identical to the original game. According to the NPD Group (which tracks game sales in North America), this became the best-selling Game Boy Advance game from June 2004 to December 2004. In 2005, Nintendo re-released this port of the game as a part of the game's 20th Anniversary; this special edition of the game went on to sell approximately 876,000 units.

It is one of the 19 unlockable NES games included in the GameCube game Animal Crossing, for which it was distributed by Famitsu as a prize for owners of Dobutsu no Mori+; outside of this, the game cannot be unlocked through in-game conventional means, and the only way to access it is through the use of a third-party cheat device such as a GameShark or Action Replay.

Super Mario Bros. is one of the 30 games included with the NES Classic Edition, a dedicated video game console. This version of the game allows for the use of suspension points to save in-game progress, and can be played in various different display styles, including its original 4:3 resolution, a "pixel-perfect" resolution and a style emulating the look of a cathode ray tube television.

In November 2020 a new version of the Game & Watch: Super Mario Bros. was released, which features the original NES version of the game with some modifications. It starts with the A button, adds the "unlocking" of hard mode after completing the normal game (which was originally lost when the NES is turned off), and adds an "infinite Mario" mode which starts the game with unlimited lives if the A button is held at the title screen.

Virtual Console 
Super Mario Bros. has been re-released for several of Nintendo's game systems as a part of their Virtual Console line of classic video game releases. It was first released for the Wii on December 2, 2006, in Japan, December 25, 2006, in North America and January 5, 2007, in PAL regions. The release is a complete emulation of the original game, meaning that nothing is changed from its original NES release. This version of the game is also one of the "trial games" made available in the "Masterpieces" section in Super Smash Bros. Brawl, where it can be demoed for a limited amount of time.
A Nintendo 3DS release of the game was initially distributed exclusively to members of Nintendo's 3DS Ambassador Program in September 2011. A general release of the game later came through in Japan on January 5, 2012, in North America on February 16, 2012, and in Europe on March 1, 2012. The game was released for the Wii U's Virtual Console in Japan on June 5, 2013, followed by Europe on September 12, 2013, and North America on September 19, 2013.

Reception 

Super Mario Bros. was immensely successful, both commercially and critically. It helped popularize the side-scrolling platform game genre, and served as a killer app for the NES. Upon release in Japan,  copies were sold during its September 1985 release month. The success of Super Mario Bros. helped increase Famicom sales to  units by January 1986. By 1987,  copies of the game had been sold for the Famicom. Outside of Japan, many were introduced to the game through the arcade version, which became the best-selling Nintendo Vs. System release with 20,000 arcade units sold within a few months in early 1986.

Altogether, excluding ports and re-releases, 40.24 million copies of the original NES release have been sold worldwide, with 29 million copies sold in North America. Including ports and re-releases, more than  units had been sold worldwide. The game was the all-time best-selling game for more than 20 years until its lifetime sales were ultimately surpassed by Wii Sports (2006). The game's Wii Virtual Console release was also successful, reaching number 1 by mid-2007, and at an estimated 660,000 units for  outside of Japan and Korea in 2009. In August 2021, an anonymous buyer paid  for a never-opened copy of Super Mario Bros., according to collectibles site Rally, surpassing the  sales record set by Super Mario 64 the previous month.

Contemporary reviews
Clare Edgeley of Computer and Video Games gave the arcade version a positive review upon its ATEI 1986 debut. She felt the graphics were simple compared to other arcade games (such as Sega's Space Harrier at the same ATEI show), but was surprised at the depth of gameplay, including its length, number of hidden secrets, and the high degree of dexterity it required. She predicted that the game would be a major success. In the fall of 1986, Top Score newsletter reviewed Vs. Super Mario Bros. for arcades, calling it "without a doubt one of the best games" of the year and stating that it combined "a variety of proven play concepts" with "a number of new twists" to the gameplay. The arcade game received the award for the "Best Video Game of 1986" at the Amusement Players Association's Players Choice Awards, held during their first US national competition in January 1987 where the game was popular among arcade players.

Reviewing the NES version, the "Video Game Update" segment of Computer Entertainer magazine in June 1986 praised the "cute and comical" graphics, lively music and most of all its depth of play, including the amount of hidden surprises and discoveries. The review said it was worthy of "a spot in the hall of fame reserved for truly addictive action games" and was a "must-have" NES game. In early 1987, Top Score reviewed the NES version, noting that it is mostly the same as the arcade version and stating that it was "a near-perfect game" with simple play mechanics, "hundreds of incentives" and hidden surprises, an "ever-changing" environment, colorful graphics and "skillfully blended" music.

The Games Machine reviewed the NES version upon its European release in 1987, calling it "a great and playable game" with praise for the gameplay, which it notes is simple to understand without needing to read the manual and has alternate routes for problems that can occasionally be frustrating but rewarding, while also praising the "splendid" graphics and sound. In 1989, ACE called it the "undisputed king of cutesy platform-style arcade adventures" and that the "game is crammed with secret levels, 'warps' and hidden treats such that you never tire of playing it." They listed it as the best NES game available in Europe. Computer and Video Games said this "platform/arcade adventure" is one of "the all-time classic video games" with "a multitude of hidden bonuses, secret warps and mystery screens." They said the graphics and sound are "good, but not outstanding, but it's the utterly addictive gameplay which makes this one of the best games money can buy."

Retrospective reception

Retrospective critical analysis of the game has been extremely positive, with many touting it as one of the best video games of all time. Nintendo Power named it the fourth best NES game, describing it as the beginning of the modern era of video games and "Shigeru Miyamoto's masterpiece". Electronic Gaming Monthly ranked it first on its list of the "Greatest 200 Games of Their Time". Official Nintendo Magazine also award the game first place in a 2009 list of greatest Nintendo games of all time. IGN included it in its lists of the best 100 games in 2005 and 2007. In 1997, Electronic Gaming Monthly named the All-Stars version of Super Mario Bros. the 37th best game of all time. In 2009, Game Informer named Super Mario Bros. the second greatest game of all time, behind The Legend of Zelda, saying that it "remains a monument to brilliant design and fun gameplay". The Game Informer staff also ranked it the second best in their 2001 list of the top 100 games. In 2012, G4 ranked Super Mario Bros. the best video game of all time, citing its revolutionary gameplay and its role in helping recover the North American gaming industry from the video game crash of 1983. In 2014, IGN named Super Mario Bros. the best Nintendo game, saying it was "the most important Nintendo game ever made". In 2005, IGN named it the greatest video game of all time. In 2015, The Strong National Museum of Play inducted Super Mario Bros. to its World Video Game Hall of Fame. In 2017, Polygon ranked it the eighth best Super Mario game, crediting it for starting "this franchise's habit of being an exception to so many rules". In 2018, Business Insider named it the second best Super Mario game.

Several critics have praised the game for its precise controls, which allow the player to control how high and far Mario or Luigi jumps, and how fast he runs. AllGame gave Super Mario Bros. a five-star rating, stating that "[T]he sense of excitement, wonder and – most of all – enjoyment felt upon first playing this masterpiece of videogame can't barely be put into words. And while its sequels have far surpassed it in terms of length, graphics, sound and other aspects, Super Mario Bros., like any classic – whether of a cinematic or musical nature – has withstood the test of time, continuing to be fun and playable" and that any gamer "needs to play this game at least once, if not simply for a history lesson". Reviewing the Virtual Console Release of the game, IGN called it "an absolute must for any gamer's Virtual Console collection." Darren Calvert of Nintendo Life called the game's visuals "unavoidably outdated" compared to newer games, but mused that they were impressive at the time that the game was released.

Game Boy versions
The Game Boy Advance port of Super Mario Bros. holds an aggregate score of 84 on Metacritic. Many critics compared the port to previous ports of the game such as Super Mario Deluxe and Super Mario All-Stars, noting its seeming lack of brand new content to separate it from the original version of the game. Jeremy Parish of 1up.com called the game "The most fun you'll ever have while being robbed blind", ultimately giving the game a score of 80% and praising its larger-scaling screen compared to Deluxe while greatly criticizing its lack of new features. IGN Craig Harris labeled the game as a "must-have", but also mused "just don't expect much more than the original NES game repackaged on a tiny GBA cart." GameSpot gave the port a 6.8 out of 10, generally praising the gameplay but musing that the port's graphical and technical differences from the original version of the game "prevent this reissue from being as super as the original game."

The Game Boy Color port of the game also received wide critical appraisal; IGN Craig Harris gave Super Mario Bros. Deluxe a perfect score, praising it as a perfect translation of the NES game. He hoped that it would be the example for other NES games to follow when being ported to the Game Boy Color. GameSpot gave the game a 9.9, hailing it as the "killer app" for the Game Boy Color and praising the controls and the visuals (it was also the highest rated game in the series, later surpassed by Super Mario Galaxy 2 which holds a perfect 10). Both gave it their Editors' Choice Award. Allgame Colin Williamson praised the porting of the game as well as the extras, noting the only flaw of the game being that sometimes the camera goes with Mario as he jumps up. Nintendo World Report Jon Lindemann, in 2009, called it their "(Likely) 1999 NWR Handheld Game of the Year", calling the quality of its porting and offerings undeniable. Nintendo Life gave it a perfect score, noting that it retains the qualities of the original game and the extras. St. Petersburg Times Robb Guido commented that in this form, Super Mario Bros. "never looked better". The Lakeland Ledger Nick S. agreed, praising the visuals and the controls. In 2004, a Game Boy Advance port of Super Mario Bros. (part of the Classic NES Series) was released, which had none of the extras or unlockables available in Super Mario Bros. Deluxe. Of that version, IGN noted that the version did not "offer nearly as much as what was already given on the Game Boy Color" and gave it an 8.0 out of 10. Super Mario Bros. Deluxe ranked third in the best-selling handheld game charts in the U.S. between June 6 and 12, 1999 with more than 2.8 million copies in the U.S. It was included on Singapore Airlines flights in 2006. Lindemann noted Deluxe as a notable handheld release in 1999.

Legacy 

The success of Super Mario Bros. led to the development of many successors in the Super Mario series of video games, which in turn form the core of the greater Mario franchise. Two of these sequels, Super Mario Bros. 2 and Super Mario Bros. 3, were direct sequels to the game and were released for the NES, experiencing similar levels of commercial success. A different sequel, also titled Super Mario Bros. 2, was released for the Famicom Disk System in 1986 exclusively in Japan, and was later released elsewhere as a part of Super Mario All-Stars under the name Super Mario Bros.: The Lost Levels. The gameplay concepts and elements established in Super Mario Bros. are prevalent in nearly every Super Mario game. The series consists of over 15 entries; at least one Super Mario game has been released on nearly every Nintendo console to date. Super Mario 64 is widely considered one of the greatest games ever made, and is largely credited with revolutionizing the platforming genre of video games and its step from 2D to 3D. The series is one of the best-selling, with more than 310 million units sold worldwide . In 2010, Nintendo released special red variants of the Wii and Nintendo DSi XL consoles in re-packaged, Mario-themed limited edition bundles as part of the 25th anniversary of the game's original release. To celebrate the series' 30th anniversary, Nintendo released Super Mario Maker, a game for the Wii U which allows players to create custom platforming stages using assets from Super Mario games and in the style of Super Mario Bros. along with other styles based around different games in the series.

The game's success helped to push Mario as a worldwide cultural icon; in 1990, a study taken in North America suggested that more children in the United States were familiar with Mario than they were with Mickey Mouse, another popular media character. The game's musical score composed by Koji Kondo, particularly the game's "overworld" theme, has also become a prevalent aspect of popular culture, with the latter theme being featured in nearly every single Super Mario game. Alongside the NES platform, Super Mario Bros. is often credited for having resurrected the video game industry after the market crash of 1983. In the United States Supreme Court case Brown v. Entertainment Merchants Association, the Electronic Frontier Foundation submitted an amicus brief which supported overturning a law which would have banned violent video games in the state of California. The brief cited social research that declared Super Mario Bros, among several others, to contain cartoon violence similar to that found in children's programs such as Mighty Mouse and Road Runner that garnered little negative reaction from the public.

Because of its status within the video game industry and being an early Nintendo game, mint condition copies of Super Mario Bros. have been considered collectors items. In 2019, the auction of a near-mint, sealed box version of the game was sold for just over $100,000 US dollars, and which is considered to have drawn wider interest in the field of video game collecting.

Video game developer Yuji Naka has cited Super Mario Bros. as a large inspiration towards the concept for the immensely successful 1991 Sega Genesis game, Sonic the Hedgehog; according to Naka, the general idea for the game first materialized when he was playing through Super Mario Bros. and trying to beat its first level as quickly as possible, and thought about the concept of a platformer based around moving as fast as possible.

Super Mario Bros. has served as inspiration for several fangames. In 2009, developer SwingSwing released Tuper Tario Tros, a game which combines elements of Super Mario Bros. with Tetris. Super Mario Bros. Crossover, a PC fangame developed by Jay Pavlina and released in 2010 as a free browser-based game, is a full recreation of Super Mario Bros. that allows the player to alternatively control various other characters from Nintendo games, including Mega Man, Link from The Legend of Zelda, Samus from Metroid, and Simon Belmont from Castlevania. Mari0, released in December 2012, combines elements of the game with that of Portal (2007) by giving Mario a portal-making gun with which to teleport through the level, and Full Screen Mario (2013) adds a level editor. In 2015, game designer Josh Millard released Ennuigi, a metafictional fangame with commentary on the original game which relates to Luigi's inability to come to terms with the game's overall lack of narrative. Super Mario Bros. is substantial in speedrunning esports, with coverage beyond video gaming and a specific version for Guinness World Records.

Minus World 

The "Minus World" or "Negative World" or "World Negative One" is an unbeatable glitch level present in the original NES release. World 1-2 contains a hidden warp zone, with warp pipes that transport the player to worlds 2, 3, and 4, accessed by running over a wall near the exit. If the player is able to exploit a bug that allows Mario to pass through bricks, the player can enter the warp zone by passing through the wall and the pipe to World 2-1 and 4-1 may instead transport the player to an underwater stage labeled "World -1". This stage's map is identical to worlds 2-2 and 7–2, and upon entering the warp pipe at the end, the player is taken back to the start of the level, thus trapping the player in the level until all lives have been lost. Although the level name is shown as " -1" with a leading space on the heads-up display, it is actually World 36–1, with the tile for 36 being shown as a blank space.

The Minus World bug in the Japanese Famicom Disk System version of the game behaves differently and creates multiple, completable stages. "World -1" is an underwater version of World 1–3 with an underwater level color palette and underwater level music and contains sprites of Princess Toadstool, Bowser and Hammer Bros. World -2 is an identical copy of World 7–3, and World -3 is a copy of World 4–4 with an underground level color palette and underground level music, and does not loop if the player takes the wrong path, contrary to the original World 4-4. After completing the level, Toad's usual message is displayed, but Toad himself is absent. After completing these levels, the game returns to the title screen as if completed, and is now replayable as if in a harder mode, since it is higher than world 8. There are hundreds of glitch levels beyond the Minus World (256 worlds are present including the 8 playable ones), which can be accessed in a multitude of ways, such as cheat codes or ROM hacking.

Other media 
The Super Mario Bros. series has inspired various media products. In October 1985, Tokuma Shoten published the book Super Mario Bros: The Complete Strategy Guide. Its content is partly recycled from Family Computer Magazine, plus new content written by Naoto Yamamoto who received no royalties. It is Japan's best-selling book of 1985 at 630,000 copies sold. Nintendo of America later translated it into English as How to win at Super Mario Bros. and published it in North America via the Nintendo Fun Club and early issues of Nintendo Power magazine.

The 1986 anime film Super Mario Bros.: The Great Mission to Rescue Princess Peach! is acknowledged as one of the first feature-length films to be based directly off of a video game, as well as one of the earliest isekai anime. The live-action Super Mario Bros. film was released theatrically in 1993, starring Bob Hoskins as Mario and John Leguizamo as Luigi. The American animated television series The Super Mario Bros. Super Show! ran from 1989 to 1990, starring professional wrestler Lou Albano as Mario and Danny Wells as Luigi. An animated film based on the series created by Illumination Entertainment is currently in production.

Super Mario Bros. was adapted into a pinball machine by Gottlieb, released in 1992. It became one of America's top ten best-selling pinball machines of 1992, receiving a Gold Award from the American Amusement Machine Association (AAMA).

Notes

References

External links 

 
 
 
 

1985 video games
Arcade video games
Famicom Disk System games
Video games about size change
Game & Watch games
Game Boy Advance games
Multiplayer and single-player video games
NEC PC-8801 games
Nintendo arcade games
Nintendo Entertainment Analysis and Development games
Nintendo Entertainment System games
Nintendo Switch Online games
Nintendo Vs. Series games
Pack-in video games
PlayChoice-10 games
Sharp X1 games
Side-scrolling platform games
Bros.
Video games scored by Koji Kondo
Video games developed in Japan
Video games designed by Shigeru Miyamoto
Video games directed by Shigeru Miyamoto
Video games produced by Shigeru Miyamoto
Virtual Console games for Nintendo 3DS
Virtual Console games for Wii
Virtual Console games for Wii U
World Video Game Hall of Fame
Video games with title protagonists